Vatuka is a given name. Notable people with the name include:

 Vatuka of Anuradhapura, King of Anuradhapura
 Vatuka of Southern India

See also
 Vaduge